Eclytus is a genus of parasitoid wasps belonging to the family Ichneumonidae.

The species of this genus are found in Europe and Northern America.

Species:
 Eclytus abdominalis Kasparyan, 1977 
 Eclytus cephalotes Kasparyan, 1977

References

Ichneumonidae
Ichneumonidae genera